Sky Dragons is a science fiction novel by the American-Irish author Anne McCaffrey and her son Todd McCaffrey  in the Dragonriders of Pern series that she initiated in 1967. Published by Del Rey Ballantine and released July 2012, Sky Dragons is the sequel to Dragon's Time.

This was the last collaboration between mother and son, which Anne described in a foreword to Dragon's Time as "helping Todd wrap up this very dramatic part of Pernese history".

Context
Following the disease which killed many of the dragons of Pern in Dragonheart, there is no longer an adequate defense against the Thread falling in the current (third) Pass of the Red Star. The story continues with Dragongirl and Dragon's Time: Sky Dragons carries on where Dragon's Time left off.

Summary

Using the dragons' ability to travel between different times, dragonwoman Xhinna, rider of blue Tazith, and her group of blue and green dragonriders go back in time to some uninhabited islands, hoping to return in sufficient numbers to be able to fight Thread effectively. This weyr is unusual because breeding is normally the preserve of the much larger gold and bronze dragons. Xhinna, the first female weyrleader and the first female rider of a blue dragon, must overcome challenges to her leadership. The new weyr must deal with predators in the unfamiliar surroundings.

Reception
Critical reaction to this novel has been mixed, with Jackie Cassada in Library Journal praising "memorable characters and a good balance of individual dramas and large-scale action" while Beth Revers in Sacramento Book Review finds that the action has crowded out character development in comparison to earlier novels.

Notes

References

External links

2012 American novels
2012 fantasy novels
2012 science fiction novels
Dragonriders of Pern books
Collaborative novels
Novels by Anne McCaffrey
Novels by Todd McCaffrey
Del Rey books